Morris L. Venden (April 5, 1932 – February 10, 2013) was a prominent Seventh-day Adventist preacher, teacher, and author, who was also a member of the Voice of Prophecy team as an associate speaker.

Biography 

Venden was born to Melvin Venden and Ivy Ruth Venden. He graduated from Fresno Adventist Academy in 1949, and received a degree from Pacific Union College, as well as several honorary degrees. He died on February 10, 2013, in College Place, Washington succumbing to FTD (Frontotemporal Dementia), a rare form of dementia.

He pastored several large Seventh-day Adventist churches such as the La Sierra University Church and Pacific Union College Church on the campus of Pacific Union College in California, and Union College Church in Nebraska. Later he pastored the Azure Hills Seventh-day Adventist Church near Loma Linda, California, from which he retired in August, 1998.

Venden then joined the Voice of Prophecy team as an associate speaker. As well as appearing on Voice of Prophecy radio broadcasts, he was also a popular speaker at both national and international Seventh-day Adventist church events.

One source described him as a "master" of the art of preaching amongst Seventh-day Adventists.

Venden was married to Marilyn, and together they ministered mostly to students and young professionals.

Venden was a strong advocate of both justification and sanctification by faith alone.  He also was a strong supporter of the Pillars of Seventh-day Adventism including the investigative judgment.  He is remembered for his parables and dry humor. As a young minister he was deeply influenced by H. M. S. Richards, Sr., the founder of the Voice of Prophecy radio program.

Publications 

Venden wrote for a Seventh-day Adventist church membership audience and published more than 30 books. Many discuss theological issues and their application in a person's life.  These books were not peer-reviewed and were published by non-academic, Seventh-day Adventist church publishing houses.

 1978, Salvation By Faith & Your Will.  Southern Publishing.  
 1979, From Exodus To Advent. Southern Publishing.  
 1980, Faith that works, (Daily Devotional), Review and Herald
 1982, Good News and Bad News about the Judgment, Pacific Press. 
 1982, How to Make Christianity Real
 1982, The Pillars, Pacific Press
 1982, The Return of Elijah, Pacific Press
 1983, Obedience of Faith, Review and Herald.
 1983, To Know God: A 5-Day Plan. Review and Herald. 
 1984, Common Ground, Review and Herald.
 1984, Uncommon Ground, Review and Herald.
 1984, Higher Ground, Review and Herald.
 1984, What Jesus Said About ...., Pacific Press
 1986, How Jesus Treated People, Pacific Press. 
 1986, Parables of the Kingdom, Pacific Press
 1986, Your Friend, the Holy Spirit, Pacific Press
 1987, How to Know God's Will in Your Life. Pacific Press. 
 1987, 95 Theses on Righteousness by Faith. Pacific Press. 
 1988, Here I Come, Ready Or Not. Pacific Press. 
 1991, Hard to Be Lost, Pacific Press
 1992, Love God and Do as You Please. Pacific Press. 
 1993, God Says, But I Think. Pacific Press. 
 1994, Modern Parables. Pacific Press. 
 1995, The Last Trolley Out. Pacific Press. 
 1996, Never Without an Intercessor, Pacific Press, Update of Good News and Bad News about the Judgment
 1996, It's Who You Know. Pacific Press. 
 1999, Faith That Works. Review and Herald. 
 2005, Why Didn't They Tell Me?: Sharing Jesus Isn't Something We Do, It's Who We Are. Pacific Press. 
 More About Jesus Seminar, vol. 1., vol. 2., and vol. 3., DVD with his son Lee Venden.

 See also 

 Seventh-day Adventist Church
 Seventh-day Adventist theology
 Seventh-day Adventist eschatology
 History of the Seventh-day Adventist Church
 28 Fundamental Beliefs
 Questions on Doctrine
 Teachings of Ellen G. White
 Inspiration of Ellen G. White
 Prophecy in the Seventh-day Adventist Church
 Investigative judgment
 Pillars of Adventism
 Second Coming
 Conditional Immortality
 Historicism
 Three Angels' Messages
 Sabbath in seventh-day churches
 Ellen G. White
 Adventism
 Seventh-day Adventist Church Pioneers
 Seventh-day Adventist worship

 References 

See also Martin Weber. Who's Got the Truth: Making Sense out of Five Different Adventist Gospels''. Columbia, Maryland: Calvary Connections, 1994. Venden is one of the five thinkers evaluated in the book.

Pacific Union College alumni
American Seventh-day Adventists
Seventh-day Adventist administrators
Seventh-day Adventist theologians
Seventh-day Adventist religious workers
American Seventh-day Adventist ministers
History of the Seventh-day Adventist Church
2013 deaths
1932 births
People from Loma Linda, California